AGP (Schizophrenia) is a 2022 Indian Tamil-language psychological thriller film directed by Ramesh Subramaniyan and starring Lakshmi Menon and R. V. Bharathan. It was released on 21 January 2022.

Cast
Lakshmi Menon as Pooja
R. V. Bharathan as Gowtham
Soniya as Priya
Sai Jivitha as Anjali
Mothiswaran as Mothis
Murugan as Varun

Production
Debutant director Ramesh Subramaniyan had earlier worked as an associate director on Naaigal Jaakirathai (2014), Miruthan (2016) and Kee (2019). Lakshmi Menon rejected thirteen scripts before accepting this film. The makers marketed it as "the first female schizophrenia Tamil film". The film was shot in Chennai, Tiruvannamalai, and Chengalpattu throughout 2020 and 2021, with production breaks taken during the COVID-19 lockdown. The first look of the film was released in October 2021, with a trailer released in early January 2022.

Reception
The film was released on 21 January 2022 across Tamil Nadu. A critic from Maalai Malar gave the film a negative review, noting it was "low on thrills". A critic from Malai Murasu also gave the film a mixed review. A critic from NewsBricks wrote "the only positive in the movie is the character of Lakshmi Menon, and the other characters are not written in-depth". A critic from the film portal nettv4u opined that "If the movie had been carried out well by the director and the supporting actors had played well, it would have reached a wide audience".

References

External links

2022 films
Tamil-language psychological thriller films
2022 drama films
Indian drama films
Films about dissociative identity disorder
2020s Tamil-language films